Matthias Ballauff (born 13 July 1952) is a German chemist and physicist, and is a professor of physics at the Free University of Berlin. His postdoctoral research and training was directed by Paul Flory. He contributed to various areas of physical chemistry, in particular to polymer science, colloidal chemistry and nanomaterials, as well as to soft matter physics. Ballauff is particularly known for having developed new catalyst materials in the form of functionalized metallic nanoparticles dispersed in liquid phase, which can greatly speed up the reaction kinetics of organic molecules.

Selected publications
.
.

References

External links
 

1952 births
Living people
20th-century German physicists
21st-century German chemists
Academic staff of the Free University of Berlin
Stanford University faculty
German expatriates in the United States
Academic staff of the University of Bayreuth
Academic staff of the Humboldt University of Berlin
Academic staff of the Karlsruhe Institute of Technology
Max Planck Institute for Polymer Research people
Johannes Gutenberg University Mainz alumni